The 13th Arizona State Legislature, consisting of the Arizona State Senate and the Arizona House of Representatives, was constituted in Phoenix from January 1, 1937, to December 31, 1938, during Rawghlie Clement Stanford's first and only term as Governor of Arizona. The number of senators and representatives remained constant, with 19 and 51 members respectively. While the Democrats regained one hundred percent of the senate seats, the Republicans broke the Democrats complete domination in the house, managing to obtain a single seat, one of the two from Navajo County.

Sessions
The Legislature met for the regular session at the State Capitol in Phoenix on January 11, 1937; and adjourned on March 13. There were four special sessions. The first ran from May 10 through May 29, 1937; the second ran from June 2 through June 22, 1937; the third special session was convened on July 22, 1937, and adjourned on August 4.  and the fourth and final special session ran from September 15 – October 4, 1938.

State Senate

Members

The asterisk (*) denotes members of the previous Legislature who continued in office as members of this Legislature.

House of Representatives

Members
The asterisk (*) denotes members of the previous Legislature who continued in office as members of this Legislature. The size of the House remained constant from the prior legislature: 51 seats.

References

Arizona legislative sessions
1937 in Arizona
1938 in Arizona
1937 U.S. legislative sessions
1938 U.S. legislative sessions